Adyar Creek is a backwater estuary located in Adyar, Chennai at the mouth of the Adyar River along the Coromandel Coast of the Bay of Bengal. The creek begins near the Chetinnad Palace, extending northward into the mainland and taking a complete U-turn near the Foreshore Estate before ending near Mandavelipakkam. The creek surrounds the Quibble Island.

Eco-restoration

 

In 2008, a 58-acre Adyar Poonga bordered by Greenways road to the south, Town Planning Scheme road on the northwest, South Canal Bank road in the north east and Santhome Causeway bridge to the east was restored in the first phase and was completed in 2010. The second phase of restoration covers a total area of 300 acres.

Ecology
Following eco-restoration, the faunal diversity in the creek has increased from 273 in 2016–2017 to 331 in 2017–2018. Insect species, including butterflies and dragonflies, has increased from 98 to 155 in the same period. A total of 8 species of molluscs, 13 species of crabs, 155 species of insects, 10 species of fishes, 10 species of amphibians, 19 species of reptiles, 105 species of birds and 16 species of animals have been recorded in the eco park area. About 57,000 mangrove species and 35,000 terrestrial saplings have been planted in the estuary.

See also

 Ennore Creek
 Pallikaranai wetland
 Birding in Chennai
 Water management in Chennai

References

Geography of Chennai
Estuaries of India